Toms Run is a stream in Forest, Jefferson, and Clarion counties, in the U.S. state of Pennsylvania. It is a tributary of the Clarion River.

Toms Run was named after a Seneca Indian.

See also
List of rivers of Pennsylvania

References

Rivers of Forest County, Pennsylvania
Rivers of Jefferson County, Pennsylvania
Rivers of Clarion County, Pennsylvania
Rivers of Pennsylvania